Iain Rawlinson is an English businessman and charity trustee. He has held a number of senior leadership positions in the financial services, resources, travel, social impact investment and philanthropic sectors. His activities are organised under Rawlinson Partners Limited.

Career
Rawlinson has a background in banking, investment and business. After attending the University of Cambridge he was called to the Bar in 1981 before joining Lazard Brothers and later Flemings. He spent six years in South Africa which was followed by leadership of the Fleming Family & Partners business in London. He is an independent director of a number of companies and is now a non-executive director of The Royal Bournemouth and Christchurch Hospitals NHS Foundation Trust and Parkmead Group PLC where he is also Remuneration Committee chair.

In an advisory capacity for the Mantegazza family, Rawlison was Executive Chairman of the Monarch Group from 2009 to 2014, during which he initiated a reorganisation and modernisation of the UK-based travel group. Throughout his Chairmanship Rawlinson lead two successful turnarounds of the Group in 2010 and 2013 without redundancy programmes or cost to the public purse. In the period during the second turnaround from 2011–2013, the oil price was US$115/bbl. He believed that the correct industry response to the competitive pressures experienced in European commercial aviation in 2014 was consolidation of carriers, creating alliances which would result in efficiencies and the safeguarding of employment and pensions. He initiated "Project Sandringham" in early 2014 when the industry faced significant challenges, which involved facilitating discussions with potential investment and merger partners. In 2014, a new senior airline executive was appointed, and a three-year-long negotiation with Boeing to update the airline's fleet with Boeing 737MAX aircraft was concluded - this deal being announced in at the Farnborough Airshow in July of that year. Rawlinson built up and communicated a distinct investment case and track record for each of the Monarch Group's three businesses to allow the underlying value of each to be demonstrated. In 2014 it emerged that alongside the Mantegazza family, Rawlinson had allowed a £220 million pension blackhole to develop, which latterly lead to Dean Street Advisors being appointed to advise the Board on a more proactive process to support the business with either merger or investment partners. Dean Street introduced Greybull Capital, who eventually bought the business in 2014 for £1, while Rawlinson was also pursuing  merger discussions with Thomas Cook. Rawlinson was replaced by Andrew Swaffield in late July 2014. 

He established Rawlinson Partners Limited in 2005 which provides leadership, advocacy and innovation to business, social enterprises and charities, with a focus on periods of transition and development. Rawlinson is a Co-founder and Chairman of Online Radio Broadcasting Limited which in 2015 launched its revolutionary social broadcasting application, crowdCaster, which won a bronze Bookmark Award for mobile applications in March 2016. From 2015–2016, he was a Partner in Renegade Inc and Chairman of Asymmetric Return Capital, a US-based investment firm. He was appointed a Fellow of the Centre for Social Innovation at the Cambridge Judge Business School in February 2016.

Charity work
Rawlinson first became involved in charitable activities in 1991, when he was a founding member of the London International Piano Competition. He was the Chairman of Tusk from 2004 to 2013 and now chairs its Development Board. Tusk is a UK charity that aims to protect wildlife, support communities and promote education in Africa. He was Chairman of the Rainmaker Foundation, a philanthropic movement which connects people with cause they care about from 2013 to 2015. He was Deputy Chair of Global Philanthropic until 2013. He is a Co-Founder and Chairman of The Online Radio Broadcasting Foundation, which supports disadvantaged communities with a focus on young people. He was Chair of Trustees at IBTC Portsmouth from 2016 to 2019, and is currently Chair of Governors at Walhampton School in Hampshire.

Personal life
He has two children, and lives in the New Forest. His other interests include writing, music, aviation, the sea, Scotland and Africa.

References

Living people
1958 births
British businesspeople
Businesspeople in aviation